Shauna O'Neill (born 18 January 2000) is a Northern Irish international lawn bowler.

Bowls career
Shauna won the Irish U-25 singles in 2019.

In 2019, she won the triples bronze medal at the Atlantic Bowls Championships and in 2020 she was selected for the 2020 World Outdoor Bowls Championship in Australia.

In 2022, she competed in the women's singles and the women's pairs at the 2022 Commonwealth Games.

References

Female lawn bowls players from Northern Ireland
Living people
2000 births
Bowls players at the 2022 Commonwealth Games